Gymnoscirtetes is a genus of spur-throated grasshoppers in the family Acrididae. There are at least 2 described species in Gymnoscirtetes.

Species
 G. morsei Hebard, 1918 (Morse's wingless grasshopper)
 G. pusillus Scudder, 1897 (little wingless grasshopper)

References

 Capinera J.L, Scott R.D., Walker T.J. (2004). Field Guide to Grasshoppers, Katydids, and Crickets of the United States. Cornell University Press.
 Otte, Daniel (1995). "Grasshoppers [Acridomorpha] C". Orthoptera Species File 4, 518.

Further reading

 

Melanoplinae